The Smith & Wesson (S&W) Model 28, also known as the Highway Patrolman, is an N-frame revolver chambered for the .357 Magnum cartridge, in production from 1954 to 1986. It is a budget version of the S&W Model 27.

Development
The Model 28, also known as the Highway Patrolman, traces its heritage back to the Smith & Wesson Registered Magnum. The Registered Magnum morphed into the .357 Magnum (first production model completed April 8, 1935). The .357 Magnum was temporarily discontinued in December 1941 when S&W turned their focus to wartime production, but was reintroduced in December 1948 with the new series beginning at serial number S72000. The new .357 Magnum had been modernized to incorporate the rebound slide operated hammer block and the new short throw hammer. It was redesignated the Model 27 in 1957. Law enforcement agencies favored the Model 27, but its high-polish finish and labor-intensive topstrap checkering added expense with no added utility for a police carry gun.

In the late 1940s and the first part of the 1950s Smith & Wesson was the only American gun company manufacturing a .357 magnum revolver. Since this relatively deluxe model was the only revolver available for this cartridge at the time, police departments, as well as individual officers and private shooters, requested from Smith & Wesson a more strictly utilitarian "budget" .357 magnum revolver. S&W responded with the Highway Patrolman (later renamed the Model 28 in 1957).  The manufacturing changes made for a more affordable revolver, though mechanically the Highway Patrolman is the same as the more ornate Model 27.

The Model 28 is unusual in that Smith & Wesson removed, rather than added, features to the Model 27 to create it, in order to reduce production costs with no reduction in utility. A classic N frame revolver, the Highway Patrolman is blued, but it is not polished, saving labor costs. The top strap and frame rounds are bead blasted to achieve a matte appearance.

The Model 28 was in production from 1954 through 1986. For most of its production run it was a steady seller with both police officers and civilian shooters.

Other users
 : Used by the Gruppo di Intervento Speciale.
 : Used by the Norwegian Police Service in some municipalities.

See also
 List of firearms

References

.357 Magnum firearms
Police weapons
Revolvers of the United States
Smith & Wesson revolvers